West Dundee is a village in Kane County, Illinois, United States. The population was 7,686 as of the 2020 US Census. It is considered a far northwest Chicago suburb.

West Dundee lies across the Fox River from East Dundee and Carpentersville.

Geography
West Dundee is located at  (42.095327, -88.285809).

Demographics

2020 census

Note: the US Census treats Hispanic/Latino as an ethnic category. This table excludes Latinos from the racial categories and assigns them to a separate category. Hispanics/Latinos can be of any race.

2000 Census

As of the census of 2000, there were 5,428 people, 2,059 households, and 1,453 families residing in the village. The racial makeup of the village was 99.02% White, 0.01% African American, 0.09% Native American, 0.21% Asian, 0.40% from other races, and 0.07% from two or more races. Hispanic or Latino of any race were 0.26% of the population.

There were 2,059 households, out of which 37.0% had children under the age of 18 living with them, 59.4% were married couples living together, 7.8% had a female householder with no husband present, and 29.4% were non-families. 24.3% of all households were made up of individuals, and 8.3% had someone living alone who was 65 years of age or older. The average household size was 2.64 and the average family size was 3.18.

In the village, the population was spread out, with 28.0% under the age of 18, 7.4% from 18 to 24, 34.0% from 25 to 44, 22.0% from 45 to 64, and 8.5% who were 65 years of age or older. The median age was 35 years. For every 100 females there were 94.5 males. For every 100 females age 18 and over, there were 89.1 males.

The median income for a household in the village was $62,540, and the median income for a family was $78,007. Males had a median income of $54,338 versus $36,111 for females. The per capita income for the village was $30,674. About 2.9% of families and 3.7% of the population were below the poverty line, including 1.4% of those under age 18 and 9.6% of those age 65 or over.

History

In 1835, Elder John and Nancy Oatman established a tavern and a store that became the core of the community. Others settlers came, and in 1837 they held a lottery to determine who would name the town. Alexander Gardiner won and named the town Dundee in honor of his Scottish hometown, with which West Dundee is now sister cities. In 1843 Scotsman Allan Pinkerton, later the renowned detective, set up business as a cooper. The town was incorporated in 1887.

Dundee was hemmed in from development for years. The Fox River formed a natural eastern barrier. To the north and west, the D. Hill Nursery, founded in 1855 by William Hill, specialized in fruit trees. The business grew to include evergreens, some of which were sent to Chicago for the World's Columbian Exposition in 1893. Expanding to 900 acres, the nursery survived the Great Depression by running a cattle feed operation that continued through World War II. Some of the thousands of seasonal workers traveled to work from Chicago by electric rail, while the majority lived on the nursery grounds.

In the 1950s, a segment of the Hill property was sold and turned into the Highlands subdivision, which was annexed into West Dundee in 1956. The community also annexed property west of Illinois 31 in 1957, Royal Lane in 1960, and the Old World subdivision in 1966. The nursery eventually sold all of its land and moved to McHenry County. Plans for the Spring Hill Mall on Hill's land began in 1973 and the project was completed in 1980. The 1.1 million-square-foot mall's retail sales boosted West Dundee's economy and created an estimated 1,600 jobs by 1982. New subdivisions were built to the west of Spring Hill Mall.

With a population of 7,331 (2010 Census data), West Dundee has managed to keep its quaintness and small-town feeling intact. Designated historical sites fill the downtown and surrounding residential neighborhood. Restored buildings include structures reported to have provided refuge for slaves on the Underground Railroad. Portions of downtown West Dundee are included with the Dundee Township Historic District on the National Register of Historic Places.

Government
The Village of West Dundee, Kane County, Illinois is a home rule municipality as contemplated under Article VII, Section 6 of the Constitution of the State of Illinois. The Village of West Dundee functions as a Council-Manager style of government. The Village President and six-member Board of Trustees are elected at-large on a nonpartisan basis for staggered four-year terms. Board elections are held during odd-numbered years.

The Village Manager is employed on a full-time basis at the will of the Village Board to perform the functions and duties specified in Title 1, Chapter 7B of the West Dundee Municipal Code, and to perform such other legally permissible and proper duties and functions as the Village Board shall from time to time designate. The Village Manager oversees the employees and departments of the Village, including Administration, Finance, Community Development, Police, Fire and Public Works. The Village of West Dundee employs fewer than 60 full-time employees.

Notable residents 
Brogan Rafferty, professional ice hockey player

See also
Dundee Township Historic District

References

Further reading

External links
 Village website
 Chamber of commerce
 Heritage festival

Villages in Kane County, Illinois
Populated places established in 1835
1835 establishments in Illinois